Matthew Selt (born 7 March 1985) is an English professional snooker player originally from Romford, east London and now living in Chelmsford, Essex. He qualified for the professional tour by finishing seventh on the Pontin's International Open Series in 2006/2007. Selt played in his first professional final in 2014 at the minor-ranking Lisbon Open, which he lost to Stephen Maguire, and has reached five quarter-finals in full ranking events. Selt won his first ranking title when he beat Lyu Haotian in the 2019 Indian Open final.

Career
He made an important breakthrough at the start of the 2009–10 season by reaching the last 32 of the Shanghai Masters by winning four qualifying matches, ending with a 5–4 victory over Steve Davis. There he faced John Higgins, losing 5–2. He also impressed at the Grand Prix, by recovering from 0–4 against Jordan Brown to win 5–4 and going on to beat Jimmy White, Stuart Pettman and Fergal O'Brien to reach the final stages of a tournament for the second time in succession. There he was drawn against Stephen Hendry who beat him 5–2.

2011/2012 season

Selt began the 2011–12 season ranked 43rd meaning he would have to win two qualifying matches to reach the ranking event main draws. He did this at the first ranking event of the season: the Australian Goldfields Open by beating Adrian Gunnell and Ricky Walden. In the last 32 he played reigning world champion John Higgins and pulled off the biggest result of his career to date by overcoming a deficit of 1–4, to triumph 5–4 and win a televised match for the first time. He then beat Stephen Hendry 5–1 to earn himself his first ranking event quarter-final, where he lost 3–5 to Shaun Murphy. 
Selt qualified for the main draw of the UK Championship for the first time in 2011 by defeating Mark King 6–4 in the final round of qualifying. His reward was a tie against former world champion Graeme Dott, who beat him 6–1. He failed to qualify for any of the remaining ranking events and finished the season ranked world number 44.

2012/2013 season
At the start of the 2012–13 season Selt reached the quarter-finals of the Australian Goldfields Open for the second consecutive season. He beat Thepchaiya Un-Nooh and Jamie Jones in qualifying and once in Australia he came back from 0–2 and 3–4 down to knock out the defending champion Stuart Bingham 5–4. He then defeated Ryan Day 5–3, before losing to Barry Hawkins by the same scoreline in the quarters. Selt struggled after this as he couldn't qualify for eight successive ranking events and only won three matches all year in the eight minor-ranking Players Tour Championship events he entered to finish a lowly 104th on the Order of Merit.

He rediscovered his form in World Championship Qualifying by seeing off Thanawat Thirapongpaiboon 10–8 to be just one match away from reaching the opening round of the tournament for the first time. Selt played 1997 champion Ken Doherty and at 9–4 ahead he looked to be heading to the Crucible with ease. However, Doherty came back to trail 7–9, and when Selt lost the next frame from a position of 55–0 ahead all the momentum was with the Irishman. The match went into a deciding frame with Selt again building a 55–0 lead and this time hanging on to seal his place in the first round, where he met world number one Mark Selby, losing 4–10. He ended the campaign where he started it, ranked world number 44.

2013/2014 season
Selt failed to qualify for the opening four ranking events of the 2013–14 season, but then whitewashed Chris Norbury 6–0 to reach the first round of the International Championship, where he lost 6–3 to Martin Gould. His best result by far in the minor-ranking European Tour events came at the final tournament, the Gdynia Open as he whitewashed three opponents 4–0 and beat Judd Trump 4–1 in a televised quarter-final, before losing by the same scoreline to Shaun Murphy in the semis. After the event, Selt stated that he had been neglecting his game for the last two years by occasionally practising two or three hours and that he believed his ranking of 50 would be 20 or 30 places higher if he had played to his true ability. He finished 32nd on the European Order of Merit, seven places outside of qualifying for the Finals. His deepest run in a ranking event this season came after this at the China Open when he beat Ryan Day 5–2, before losing 5–2 to Ali Carter in the last 32.

2014/2015 season
Selt progressed through to the semi-finals of the Haining Open, losing 4–1 to Stuart Bingham. His first win at the venue stage of a full ranking event this season came courtesy of a 6–0 whitewash over Hammad Miah at the UK Championship. Selt then knocked out Xiao Guodong and Rory McLeod both 6–4 to face Ronnie O'Sullivan in the fourth round. O'Sullivan made a 147 in the final frame as he won 6–0, with Selt saying afterwards that despite having numerous chances throughout the match he never settled. Selt responded in his next event by winning four matches to reach the quarter-finals of the Lisbon Open and then defeated Judd Trump 4–1 and Barry Hawkins 4–2 to play in his first final in a minor-ranking event. He took the opening frame against Stephen Maguire, but went on to lose 4–2. His first quarter-final in a ranking event this season came at the PTC Grand Final after he eliminated Oliver Lines 4–1 and Chris Wakelin 4–2 and he led Mark Williams 3–1, but could not reach the first semi-final of his career as Williams would knock him out in a final frame decider. Selt's season looked to be ending in disappointment as he trailed Jimmy White 7–2 in the second round of World Championship qualifying. However, he took eight of the nine frames upon the resumption of play and won in the final round 10–8 against Tom Ford. In the first round Selt lost another opening session 7–2 this time against Barry Hawkins. He also went on to be 9–4 behind but then won five frames in a row which included back-to-back centuries and a 94 break. He couldn't win his first match at the Crucible Theatre as he lost the deciding frame. Selt finished a season inside the top 32 in the rankings for the first time in his career as he was the world number 30.

2015/2016 season
In the first round of the 2015 Australian Goldfields Open, Neil Robertson fought back to 4–4 after Selt had been 4–0 up. The deciding frame lasted 55 minutes and Selt took it on the final blue and then edged past Mark Joyce 5–4 to reach the quarter-finals of the event for the third time. He was unable to feature in his first ranking event semi-final as Martin Gould comfortably beat him 5–1. However, Selt rose to a career-high 27th in the world rankings soon afterwards and credited his improvement in play to his coach Chris Henry, his mentor Stephen Hendry, as well as his own personal fitness. He lost 5–4 on the final black to Judd Trump in the second round of the Shanghai Masters. Despite describing his play as pretty terrible, Selt reached the fourth round of the UK Championship and recovered from 3–1 down against Luca Brecel to knock him out 6–4. He also said that his 6–0 loss to Ronnie O'Sullivan a year earlier had improved him as a player. In his first UK quarter-final he was defeated 6–1 by Mark Selby, but the £20,000 in prize money he earned is the biggest of his career so far. O'Sullivan beat Selt 3–0 in the semi-finals of the non-ranking Championship League. He failed to qualify for the World Championship after losing 10–9 to Mitchell Mann in the second qualifying round. His ranking over the course of the season rose five places to world number 25.

2016/2017 season
Selt overcame Matthew Stevens 5–2 and Sam Craigie 5–4 at the World Open, before losing 5–2 to Anthony McGill in the third round. He only won one match at the venue stage in the next nine ranking events, before reaching the third round of the Gibraltar Open with victories over Rory McLeod and Stephen Maguire. Selt would lose 4–1 to Judd Trump. He could not qualify for the World Championship as he was beaten 10–6 by Hossein Vafaei in the second round.

2017/2018 season 
Selt's best result for the season came in the Gibraltar Open, in which he knocked out Mitchell Mann, Liang Wenbo before losing to Kyren Wilson in the last 16.

2018/2019 season: First ranking title 
Selt secured his maiden ranking title at the Indian Open after beating John Higgins 4–2 in the semi final and Lyu Haotian 5–3 in the final. He was unable to qualify for the World Snooker Championship after losing 10–4 to Zhao Xintong in the final qualifying round.

2019/2020 season 
In July 2019, Selt reached the semi final of the Riga Masters after wins over the likes of Jimmy Robertson, Lu Ning, and Mark King before being defeated by the eventual champion Yan Bingtao. He failed to qualify for the World Snooker Championship again after being defeated by Kurt Maflin in the final qualifying round, losing 10–1.

2020/2021 season 
Selt reached another semi final of a ranking event after defeating Stephen Hendry, Barry Hawkins, Kyren Wilson, Soheil Vahedi, and Chris Wakelin before losing to the eventual champion Judd Trump. Most notably, his first round match against Stephen Hendry, the seven-time world champion, was Hendry's first professional match since retiring in 2012. In April 2021, after dispatching Scott Donaldson 10–3 in the final qualifying round, Selt qualified for the World Snooker Championship for the first time in 6 years. He drew Barry Hawkins in the first round and was defeated 3–10.

2021/2022 season 
In the third round of the 2021 UK Championship, Selt caused a major upset by defeating third seed Judd Trump 6–3; he lost in the next round against Barry Hawkins by a revers of the scoreline after leading 3–1. He also reached the quarter-finals of the next ranking event, the Scottish Open, losing in the deciding frame against eventual champion Luca Brecel. At the inaugural Turkish Masters, Selt reached the second ranking final of his career, notably defeating a resurgent Ding Junhui 6–5 in the semi-final. However, he lost in the final against Trump by a scoreline of 4–10. Selt reached the final qualifying round of the World Championship where he faced Thepchaiya Un-Nooh whom he had beaten in all previous professional encounters; however, from leading 6–4 Selt went on to lose 7–10.

Performance and rankings timeline

Career finals

Ranking finals: 2 (1 title)

Minor-ranking finals: 1

Non-ranking finals: 2 (1 title)

References

External links

Matthew Selt at worldsnooker.com

English snooker players
1985 births
Living people
People from Romford